TDSS may refer to:
Alureon, a trojan sometimes also known as TDSS
Tommy Douglas Secondary School